was an idol girl group based in Taiwan and associated with Hello! Project and signed under Forward Music. They were Hello! Project's first overseas group and the flagship band of Hello! Project Taiwan. The members consisted of Wu Si-hsuan ("Shen Shen"), Chung An-chi ("Anchī"), Tseng Te-ping ("Pei Pei"), Chao Kuo-jung ("Yōko"), Chiu Tsui-ling ("Rei Rei"), and Ku Yun ("Gū-chan"), with each member officially represented by an ice cream flavor. Since their debut, the group has released music in both Japanese and Chinese before disbanding in 2010.

History 
In 2007, Japanese idol group Hello! Project held the Hello! Project New Star Audition to recruit members for a new girl group based in Taiwan in an attempt to expand towards the Chinese market. The results were announced in September 2008, where six winners were selected. The winners were then taken to Japan for three months to undertake singing and dancing lessons as well as to record their first mini-album. The group was named Ice Creamusume, and they were set up as Hello! Project's first overseas group and Hello! Project Taiwan's flagship group.

The music video for "Love Debut", the first track on the album, was released in Taiwan on December 31, 2008. On January 9, 2009, Ice Creamusume released their first mini-album 1st Best! in Taiwan, while it was released in Japan on January 18. On January 31 and February 1, 2009, they made their Japanese debut at the Hello Pro Awards '09: Elder Club Graduation Commemoration Special concert, performing "Love Debut (Japanese Version)."

On February 4, 2009, a music video for their second mini-album title track, a cover version of "Love Revolution 21", was released. The music video for Ice Creamusume's third title track, "There Can't Be Love on a Planet Without Rain, Right?", was released in March 2009.

In spite of promotions, Ice Creamusume's sales performed below expectations and they failed to attract an audience. Ice Creamusume made their last appearance as a group in July 2009 at the Hello! Project Concert 2009 Summer: Hello! Champloo concert, performing "Love Debut (Japanese Version)" with Morning Musume's Jun Jun and Lin Lin filling in for Tseng and Ku. Afterwards, they became inactive for the rest of 2009 and were dropped as a music act in 2010.

Members
The members of the group are referred to by their full birthnames in Chinese media and by their official Japanese nicknames in Japanese media.

 Wu Si-hsuan /  - leader
 Chung An-chi /  - sub-leader
 Tseng Te-ping / 
 Chao Kuo-jung / 
 Chiu Tsui-ling / 
 Ku Yun /

Discography

Extended plays

References

External links 
 Official Chinese Hello! Project profile (archived) 
 Official Japanese Hello! Project profile 
 Official blog 

Taiwanese girl groups
Musical groups established in 2008
Musical groups disestablished in 2010
Japanese idol groups
Hello! Project
Hello! Project groups
Japan–Taiwan relations